Daniel Rubin (born July 29, 1985) is a Swiss professional ice hockey player who is currently a free agent. He last played for Genève-Servette HC of the National League (NL).

Playing career 
Rubin made his professional debut with EHC Biel playing 41 games in the 2003-04 Swiss League (SL) season. He won 3 Swiss League titles with Biel in 2004, 2006 and 2007.

Rubin then moved to EHC Basel and played his first National League (NL) game in 2007.

In the summer of 2008, Rubin joined Genève-Servette HC where he played 4 seasons before joining SC Bern for the 2012-13 season, he won his first NL title in his first year with Bern. He played one more year in Bern and had to fight relegation at the end of the 2013-14 season.

Rubin then rejoined his former team, Genève-Servette HC on a two-year deal. He won the 2014 Spengler Cup while playing with Geneva. On August 3, 2016, he was signed to a two-year contract extension by Geneva.

International play 
Rubin was named to Switzerland men's team for the 2011 IIHF World Championship and the 2012 IIHF World Championship. He played a total of 7 games over those 2 tournaments, failing to score any point.

External links

1985 births
Living people
SC Bern players
Swiss ice hockey forwards
Ice hockey people from Bern